Guzmania polycephala is a plant species in the genus Guzmania. This species is native to Panama and Costa Rica.

References

polycephala
Flora of Costa Rica
Flora of Panama
Plants described in 1916